The Manchester Football Association (also known as the Manchester FA) is the governing body for association football in the centre of the city of Manchester, England. They are responsible for the governance and development of football at all levels in the area.

Administration
Manchester Football Association aims to establish safe and structured football opportunities for the benefit of all concerned irrespective of age, colour, gender and ability. The MFA provide the appropriate structures and systems to enable the association to manage, regulate and promote the game of football within the County.  This also enables them to assist with the development of the game at all levels, ensuring they are able to increase the quality and levels of participation across a broad spectrum of players, officials, parents and supporters in the County.

The administrative area covered by the Manchester FA and Lancashire County FA overlaps, in addition to Cheshire FA, Derbyshire FA and Liverpool County FA.  According to the Memorandum on Areas and Overlapping of Associations the Manchester FA covers the area 12 miles from Manchester Town Hall.

Manchester FA has relocated their Administration Headquarters to the Platt Lane Complex. The offices were opened at their new Headquarters in 2014. Manchester FA relocated the Administration Headquarters again to the Manchester Tennis and Football Centre in the Etihad Campus, which was opened in May 2018.

Affiliated Leagues

Men's Saturday Leagues
Manchester Football League
Lancashire and Cheshire Amateur League
Manchester Saturday Morning League (1989)
Wigan and District League

Other Leagues
Greater Manchester Ability Counts Football League (2003)
Greater Manchester Police League (1975)
Greater Manchester Veterans League (2001)
ISS League (Wednesdays) (2004)
Manchester Jewish Soccer League (1948) 
South Manchester and Cheshire Christian League

Men's Sunday Leagues
Cheshire and Manchester Sunday League (1971)
Eccles Sunday League (1969)
Hyde & District Sunday League (1968)
Manchester Accountants Sunday League
Manchester Amateur Sunday League (1947)
Middleton and District Sunday League (1959)
Oldham Sunday Football League (1970)
Stockport and Cheadle Sunday League
Tameside Sunday League (1965)

Ladies and Girls Leagues
Greater Manchester Women's Football League
Cheshire and Manchester Women's League
North Manchester Girls League (2000)
South Manchester Girls League (2003)

Youth Leagues
Bury and Radcliffe Junior League
City of Salford Soccer League
East Manchester Junior League (1970)
Manchester Youth and Mini Soccer League (1982)
North Bury Junior League (1973)
Stockport Metro Junior League
Tameside and District Junior League (1970)
Timperley Junior League

Small Sided Leagues
Manchester College Small Sided League
Manchester FA Business League Summer 6’s
Manchester Futsal League
Manchester Women's Small Sided League
Salford Small Sided Veterans League

Disbanded or Amalgamated Leagues
A number of leagues that were affiliated to the Manchester FA have disbanded or amalgamated with other leagues including:

Ashton and District League
Ashton and District Sunday League (formed in 1959 and disbanded in 2010)
Blackley Amateur Sunday League
Bury Amateur League
Eccles and District Amateur League
Manchester Amateur League
Manchester and District Alliance
Oldham Amateur League
Reddish and District Junior League (now known as the East Manchester Junior League)
Rochdale Alliance (disbanded in 2017)
Rusholme Sunday League
Salford Sunday League
South Manchester and Wythenshawe League

Affiliated Member Clubs
Among the notable clubs that are affiliated to the Manchester FA are:

Clubs in the Premier League and The Football League that located in the Manchester area include:

Other clubs that are affiliated to the Manchester FA include:

County Cup Competitions
The Manchester FA run the following Cup Competitions:

List of Manchester Challenge Shield Winners

Source

List of Manchester Intermediate Challenge Cup Winners
(Formerly Manchester Challenge Shield)

Source

List of Manchester Premier Challenge Cup Winners
(Formerly Manchester Intermediate Challenge Cup)

Source

List of Manchester Junior Cup Winners

Source

List of Manchester Challenge Trophy Winners
(Formerly Manchester Junior Cup)

Source

List of Manchester Amateur Cup Winners

Source

Directors & Officials

Board of Directors
J Green
D Owen (Chair)
J McLellan-Grant (Vice Chair) 
J Craven
C Bridgford
C Brindley (INED)
A Lawler (INED)
D Treasure (INED)
P Kay (INED)
D O'Donoghue (INED)

Key Officials
Colin Bridgford  (Chief Executive)
Daniel Green (Head of Participation &  Development)
Richard Cooper (Head of Business Services &  Regulations)
Lee Folkard (Participation Manager) 
Linda Meehan  (Financial Controller)

References

External links

County football associations
Football in Greater Manchester